Founded in 2006, Galerie Pascal Cuisinier specializes in first generation modern French designers from 1951–1961, and is located adjacent to Square Gabriel-Pierné, just behind the Institut de France at 13 Rue de Seine — in Paris's 6th arrondissement.

Pascal Cuisinier, founder of the gallery 
Founder of the eponymous gallery, Pascal Cuisinier was born in 1969 in Saint-Germain-en-Laye. After studying architecture, he specialized in 1930s French Decorative arts and worked at the Antica market of Saint-Ouen.

He resumed his studies in plastic arts and art philosophy, and started work on a thesis entitled 'Towards an allographisation of contemporary plastic arts'. In 2006, he returned to Saint-Ouen, at the Paul Bert market, where he is recognized as the design specialist of the French generation born between 1920 and 1930,where the majority of production was produced between 1951 and 1961.

In 2011, he opened a space at 13 rue de Seine in Saint-Germain-des-Prés, divided between an exhibition space that displays furniture and rare pieces and a research and documentation office.

The first generation of modern French designers 
Since 2006, Galerie Pascal Cuisinier has advocated the generation of French designers born between 1925 and 1930, who all followed a similar path of education. Trained at either the National School of Decorative Arts (École nationale supérieure des arts décoratifs) or the Camondo School (École Camondo), they opened their agency in the early 1950s and then produced their first pieces. Modern and innovative, the pieces they designed were the start of what would become the method of production and distribution of furniture for the following decades, undertaking a shift from Decorative arts to design.

Without becoming a group or an artistic movement in its own right, these young designers were a 'generational phenomenon': they shared the same editorial choices and marked their era by participating in an extraordinary artistic revival, typical of the 1950s and 1960s.

International fairs and exhibitions 
Galerie Pascal Cuisinier often focuses on thematic or monographic exhibitions presented at its gallery or during international fairs such as PAD Paris, PAD London, Design Miami/ Basel, Design Miami, etc.

The exhibition '100 French chairs 1951–1961' showcased in 2014 is a perfect illustration of the gallery's approach. It unveiled the aesthetic and changes in form, which revolutionized the concept of seating in France during the 1950s. The same year, the gallery also paid tribute to Joseph-André Motte, on the first anniversary of his death with a solo show which displayed around fifty emblematic pieces created by the designer during his early career.

2015: Jacques Biny, Producer/Designer

2014: 100 French chairs 1951–1961

2014: Tribute to Joseph-André Motte

2013: Focus on André Simard

2012: Focus on Joseph-André Motte

2012: Pierre Guariche, Creator of Light / 1950–1959

2012: Cycle of thematic exhibitions 'First French design', episode #3: 'White’

2011: Cycle of thematic exhibitions 'First French design', episode #2: 'Young generation of the 1950s’

2010: Cycle of thematic exhibitions 'First French design', episode #1: 'Office’

2010: 'Meubles TV: Avant-garde designer 1952–1959’

2009: ‘Alain Richard, lighting and furniture 1950–1970’

Designers represented by the gallery 
Galerie Pascal Cuisinier champions the first generation of modern French designers:
 Janine Abraham and Dirk Jan Rol
 René-Jean Caillette
 Geneviève Dangles and Christian Defrance
 Pierre Guariche
 André Monpoix
 Michel Mortier
 Joseph-André Motte
 Pierre Paulin
 Antoine Philippon and Jacqueline Lecoq
 Alain Richard
The gallery also has an important collection of French lighting from the 1950s and 1970s and promotes the three main producers/designers of this era:
 Pierre Disderot
 Robert Mathieu
 Jacques Biny

Publications 
The gallery has published two standard works:

Bibliography

References

External links 
 www.galeriepascalcuisinier.com

Art museums and galleries in Paris